The Saif Sports Saga women's cricket team is a Pakistani women's cricket team, sponsored by the Saif Sports Saga. They competed in the National Women's Cricket Championship and the Women's Cricket Challenge Trophy between 2014 and 2016.

History
Saif Sports Saga first competed in the Women's Cricket Challenge Trophy in 2014, finishing third out of four teams. The following season, 2015–16, they finished bottom of the five team group.

The side also competed in the National Women's Cricket Championship  in 2015 and 2016, both times reaching the final Super League stage, finishing 4th overall in 2015 and 3rd overall in 2016.

Players

Notable players
Players who played for Saif Sports Saga and played internationally are listed below, in order of first international appearance (given in brackets):

 Armaan Khan (2005)
 Asmavia Iqbal (2005)
 Sabahat Rasheed (2005)
 Sumaiya Siddiqi (2007)
 Nahida Khan (2009)
 Marina Iqbal (2009)
 Kainat Imtiaz (2010)
 Elizebath Khan (2012)
 Javeria Rauf (2012)
 Sidra Nawaz (2014)
 Diana Baig (2015)
 Ayesha Zafar (2015)
 Nashra Sandhu (2017)
 Aiman Anwer (2016)
 Rameen Shamim (2019)

Seasons

National Women's Cricket Championship

Women's Cricket Challenge Trophy

Honours
 National Women's Cricket Championship:
 Winners (0):
 Best finish: 3rd (2016)
 Women's Cricket Challenge Trophy
 Winners (0):
 Best finish: 3rd (2015–16)

References

Women's cricket teams in Pakistan